High Speed Surface Transport (HSST) is a Japanese maglev train system which uses electromagnetic levitation technology. The Linimo line in Aichi Prefecture, Japan, uses a descendant of HSST technology.

See also
 SCMaglev
 Transrapid
 Krauss-Maffei Transurban - Electromagnetic suspension technology had been transferred from Krauss-Maffei.
 ROMAG

References

Bibliography 
 

Driverless Maglev